Willy Lardon (1916 – 1992) was a Swiss wrestler. He competed at the 1948 Summer Olympics and the 1952 Summer Olympics.

References

External links
 

1916 births
1992 deaths
Swiss male sport wrestlers
Olympic wrestlers of Switzerland
Wrestlers at the 1948 Summer Olympics
Wrestlers at the 1952 Summer Olympics
Sportspeople from Bern
20th-century Swiss people